Cuba competed at the 1904 Summer Olympics in St. Louis, United States.

Medalists

Medals that now IOC attributed to the United States, but until 2021 attributed to Cuba.

Results by event

Athletics

Fencing

Notes

References

Official Olympic Reports
International Olympic Committee results database

Nations at the 1904 Summer Olympics
1904
Olympics